Joseph Sadoc Alemany y Conill, O.P. (Spanish: José Sadoc Alemany y Conill; July 3, 1814 – April 14, 1888) was a Spanish Catholic clergyman, who served most of his career in California. He served as the first Bishop of Monterey (1850–53) and then as Archbishop of San Francisco (1853–84).

Early life
Alemany was born in Vic, Catalonia, on July 3, 1814, to Antoni Alemany i Font and Miquela dels Sants i Saborit.

Alemany entered the Dominican Order in 1821 and pursued his theological studies at the convents of Trumpt and Garona. His solemn profession of religious vows made in September 1831, the same year that his protégé, Patrick Manogue was born in Ireland. He was then sent to Rome to study at the College of St. Thomas in Rome, the future Pontifical University of Saint Thomas Aquinas, commonly referred to as the Angelicum, where in 1840 he was made Lector in Theology.

Alemany was ordained a priest in the cathedral of Viterbo on March 11, 1837, by Archbishop Gaspare Bernardo Pianetti. During his studies in Rome, he had an audience with Pope Gregory XVI.

Career

The Dominican superiors sent Alemany to the United States in 1841. The first years of his missionary activity were spent in Nashville and Memphis, Tennessee, and in 1847, he was made provincial of the order of Dominicans in the state of Ohio. He eventually becoming a naturalized United States citizen.

In 1848, Alemany was appointed Prior Provincial of the Dominican Province of St. Joseph.

In 1850 his abilities attracted the attention of the papal court during his presence at the general chapter of the order. Summoned to Rome, Alemany met on June 11, 1850, with Cardinal Giacomo Filippo Fransoni, informed of his appointment as Bishop of the Roman Catholic Diocese of Monterey in California. Alemany replied, "No." Pope Pius IX ordered Alemany to a private audience on June 16. Pope Pius told Alemany, "You must go to California....Where others are drawn by gold, you must carry the Cross." Fransoni consecrated Alemany as Bishop of Monterey on June 30, 1850, in Rome; thus, becoming the first American bishop in California.

Monterey
Before leaving Europe, Alemany determined that he would need the help of a community of religious women for the education of the children of his new territory. He traveled around, visiting various monasteries of Dominican nuns. When he arrived in Paris, he went to the Monastery of the Cross there, where he presented his request for volunteers among the Dominican Sisters. He had one recruit, Sister Mary of the Cross Goemaere, O.P., a Belgian novice.

Alemany soon set sail with her and a fellow Dominican friar, Francis Sadoc Vilarrasa, O.P., arriving in San Francisco on December 6, 1850. Goemaere then founded a community in Monterey which was to become the Dominican Sisters of San Rafael.

San Francisco
Leaving Rome immediately, he brought to his new see religious of both sexes, with whose aid he founded various institutions of learning in California.

When the Roman Catholic Archdiocese of San Francisco was erected July 29, 1853, Alemany was appointed by Pope Pius as its first archbishop. Alemany arrived in San Francisco finding three established Catholic parishes Mission Dolores (San Francisco de Asís) (1776), St. Francis of Assisi (1849) and St. Patrick (1851). As Archbishop of San Francisco, Alemany presided over what became a multinational diocese, owing to the influx of people during the California Gold Rush, and parishes were established for San Francisco's Italian, Irish, French, German and Mexican communities.

Catholic religious institutes were also active during his tenure, with the Society of Jesus establishing Santa Clara University and the University of San Francisco, the De La Salle Christian Brothers taking over the diocesan Saint Mary's College, and the Sisters of Notre Dame de Namur establishing in San Jose the Notre Dame de Namur University, and the Sisters of the Holy Names of Jesus and Mary establishing in Oakland the Holy Names University. He and Vilarosa also founded the Dominican Province of the Most Holy Name in 1851, and the Dominican Sisters of San Rafael and Dominican Sisters of Mission San Jose were established in the archdiocese in 1851 and 1876, respectively.

As Bishop of Monterey Alemany had filed a petition with the Public Land Commission on February 19, 1853, for the return of all former mission lands in California. The scope of his authority was large, as the Diocese of Monterey originally encompassed the entire area of the former Mexican province of Alta California, while the Archdiocese of San Francisco encompassed all of the state of California north of Monterey Bay as well as territories that would become Nevada and Utah. However, Alemany wished to return to missionary work and requested a coadjutor bishop. In 1883, Bishop Patrick William Riordan was appointed by Pope Leo XIII coadjutor, and would succeed Alemany upon the latter's resignation as archbishop in 1884.

Later life

After his resignation, Alemany left San Francisco in May 1885 to return to his homeland. In the course of the journey east he toured New York, was presented by Catholic General William Rosecrans to President Grover Cleveland. He arrived in Italy, having an audience with Pope Leo XIII and was appointed titular archbishop of Pelusium.

Alemany returned to Catalonia in a Valencian convent, intending to devote the remainder of his life to the rehabilitation of the Dominican order in Spain, and he died there on April 14, 1888. He was buried in the Church of Sant Domènec in his native Vic.

In 1965, Alemany's body was brought back to San Francisco after a funeral Mass said by Archbishop Joseph T. McGucken at the Old Cathedral of Saint Mary of the Immaculate Conception his remains were buried in the Archbishops' Crypt in the mausoleum in Holy Cross Cemetery in Colma, California.

He was also an author, publishing his view of The Life of St. Dominick.

Alemany Boulevard and the Alemany Maze in San Francisco, Bishop Alemany High School in Mission Hills, California and the Archbishop Alemany Library at Dominican University of California in San Rafael are all named in his honor.

References

Citations

Sources
  
 Mc Gloin, S.J., John B. California's First Archbishop: The Life of Joseph Sadoc Alemany, O.P., 1814–1888. New York: Herder and Herder, 1966.
 Parmisano, Fabian Stan. Mission West:  The Western Dominican Province, 1850–1966. Oakland, California: Western Dominican Province, 1995.
 
 Who Was Who in America: Historical Volume, 1607–1896. Chicago: Marquis Who's Who, 1967.

External links

Dominican Friars: Pioneers in the Archdiocese
Presentation Sisters to celebrate 150 years

1814 births
1888 deaths
People from Vic
Spanish Dominicans
Pontifical University of Saint Thomas Aquinas alumni
Dominican missionaries
Spanish Roman Catholic missionaries
Roman Catholic missionaries in the United States
Spanish emigrants to the United States
Dominican bishops
Roman Catholic Diocese of Monterey in California
Catalan American
Roman Catholic bishops from Catalonia
Spanish Roman Catholic bishops in North America
American Dominicans
19th-century Roman Catholic archbishops in the United States
Clergy from San Francisco
Roman Catholic archbishops of San Francisco
Burials in the Province of Barcelona
Burials at Holy Cross Cemetery (Colma, California)